Malawali is an island in the state of Sabah, Malaysia located in the Sulu Sea. It is located within the Kudat Division, and sits nearby the islands of Banggi and Balambangan. The island is surrounded by coral reefs and is one of the popular diving spot on the north-east coast of Sabah.

See also
 List of islands of Malaysia

References

Islands of Sabah